Danil Faizullin (born December 3, 1993) is a Russia professional ice hockey player. He is currently playing with Admiral Vladivostok of the Kontinental Hockey League (KHL).

Faizullin made his Kontinental Hockey League debut playing with Ak Bars Kazan during the 2013–14 season.

References

External links

1993 births
Living people
Admiral Vladivostok players
Ak Bars Kazan players
Amur Khabarovsk players
Avangard Omsk players
Bars Kazan players
Neftyanik Almetyevsk players
Russian ice hockey left wingers
Saryarka Karagandy players
Universiade medalists in ice hockey
Universiade bronze medalists for Russia
Competitors at the 2013 Winter Universiade